Nicholas Doro (born December 27, 1974) is a Mauritian football player who previously played for AS Rivière du Rempart as a goalkeeper. He currently plays for Pamplemousses SC. He has also represented Mauritius internationally with the national team.

References

External links 

1974 births
Living people
Mauritian footballers
Mauritius international footballers
Association football goalkeepers
Pamplemousses SC players
AS Rivière du Rempart players